Tzameret Fuerst (born 19 January 1971) is an Israeli-American social entrepreneur. She is the co-founder and former CEO of Circ MedTech, developers of PrePex, a medical device for voluntary medical male circumcision (VMMC) of adults used in sub-Saharan Africa to prevent the spread of HIV.

Background

Social entrepreneurship
Fuerst had over 12 years experience in strategic marketing and business development roles in Israel and the USA before changing her career path in 2003, to become a social entrepreneur. She spent the first six years in the non-profit sector, during which Fuerst founded several advocacy and social organizations for the Israeli-American community in New York.
She was chairwoman and founding member of Dor Chadash, a network of Israeli and American Jews who seek to create connections with Israel and each other through cultural, educational and social events. In 2014, the organization was acquired by the Israeli American Council (IAC), making it part of a national movement.
In 2007 Fuerst, together with 92nd Street Y established Israeliness, a New York-based program helping expat children sustain their Jewish and Israeli heritage.

In 2010, Fuerst became the Co-Founder and CEO of Circ MedTech, a double bottom line company that developed PrePex.

During her tenure as CEO, PrePex attained WHO prequalification of Male Circumcision Devices as announced by the U.S. Global AIDS Coordinator, Ambassador Eric P. Goosby, gained the US Food and Drug Administration (FDA) clearance, was referenced by Bill Gates in his Annual Philanthropy Letter, was secured in pilots funded by the Bill & Melinda Gates Foundation and the US Government (PEPFAR) in target sub-Saharan African countries and won the Technology for Health Award by GBCHealth. In 2013, Fuerst jointly announced the first commercial launch in a press conference in Rwanda alongside the Minister of Health, Dr. Agnes Binagwaho. The Executive Director of UNAIDS, Michel Sidibe, mentioned PrePex as a revolution in the acceleration of HIV prevention, after visiting the Nyamata hospital in Rwanda, a site selected for a safety study of the circumcision device.

Fuerst’s experience in the nonprofit social entrepreneurial sector helped attract impact investors such as Acumen (in 2011), a nonprofit global venture fund and BTG Pactual, a Brazilian investment bank.

References

External links 
New York Times interviews Fuerst at announcement of FDA clearance of PrePex
Interview with Tzameret Fuerst on The Health Show (BBC World News)
Tzameret Fuerst's official English site
Tzameret Fuerst's official Hebrew site
Tzameret Fuerst at the AIPAC Policy Conference 2013 Presentation of the PrePex device in Washington DC
Fuerst's speech at TEDx 2015 on loneliness among the elderly

1971 births
Living people
Social entrepreneurs
American people of Israeli descent
21st-century Israeli businesswomen
21st-century Israeli businesspeople
20th-century Israeli businesswomen
20th-century Israeli businesspeople